Semeyavia O.A. (sometimes also transcribed Semeiavia) was an airline based in Semey, Kazakhstan, operating scheduled domestic flights between its home base at Semey Airport and Almaty International Airport. Ceased operations in July 2013.

Fleet 
As Semeyavia is on the List of air carriers banned in the European Union due to safety concerns arising from its ageing fleet of Yakovlev Yak-40 aircraft, the company decided to renew its fleet with Embraer ERJ-145 aircraft, the first of which (formerly having belonged to now-defunct Athens Airways) was delivered in December 2010. Thus, the Semeyavia fleet currently consists of the following aircraft:

Incidents
On 19 February 1997, a Semeyavia Yakovlev Yak-40 (aircraft registration UN-87233) overshot the runway upon landing at Semey Airport following a scheduled domestic passenger flight. There were no fatalities amongst the 14 passengers and 4 crew members on board, but the aircraft was damaged beyond repair.

References

Defunct airlines of Kazakhstan
Airlines disestablished in 2013
Airlines formerly banned in the European Union